Epischidia is a genus of snout moths. It was described by Rebel in 1901.

Species
 Epischidia caesariella (Hampson in Ragonot, 1901)
 Epischidia fulvostrigella (Eversmann, 1844)

References

Phycitini
Pyralidae genera